The Museum of Perth is a private, non-profit museum located in the Atlas Building, 8-10 The Esplanade (opposite Elizabeth Quay), in Perth, Western Australia. It aims to chronicle the social, cultural, political and architectural history of Perth.

Beginnings
It began life as a virtual museum on the social media site Twitter in October 2012, created by Dallas Robertson, a museum studies student at Edith Cowan University. It was expanded into Facebook the following year.

Following an online article about the Twitter page from the Australian Broadcasting Corporation (Perth) in 2013, Perth City councillor Reece Harley approached Robertson with the view to opening a bricks and mortar version of the museum.

In 2014 the still-virtual museum gained local attention when it led a campaign against the City of Perth to save an art deco factory from demolition, which ultimately failed when a Western Australian state minister intervened to support the local government's decision.

Formation
By July 2015 the cyber Museum of Perth moved a step closer to reality when the Perth History Association was set up comprising members Dallas Robertson, Reece Harley, Ryan Zaknich, Ryan Mossny, Richard Offen and Diana Warnock. The not-for-profit organisation subsequently founded the Museum of Perth with Reece Harley as executive director. In October 2015 the Museum of Perth became a reality, with project manager Alysha Worth employed to oversee its establishment.

Exhibits
Along with a permanent exhibition on the history of Perth, the museum also contains a micro-cinema and hosts rotating exhibitions on Perth's social history.

Events
The museum also has been involved in the annual Heritage Perth "Perth Heritage Days".

 Shaping Perth
 Soldiers of Barrack Street
 Demolished Icons of Perth

References

External links

 

Museums in Perth, Western Australia
The Esplanade (Perth)